The Church of Nuestra Señora de la Mayor is a Roman Catholic church in Soria, Castile and León, Spain.

It was built in the 16th century on the remains of the Romanesque church of Saint Giles, dating from the 12th or the 13th century. 
The low, square-shaped tower was part of the original building.

Exterior
The Romanesque doorway  in the southern wall is composed of three archivolts and decorated capitals. Next to this entrance stands the bronze sculpture (2012) by Ricardo Gonzalez Gil, representing Leonor Izquierdo Cuevas, dressed in the fashion of her time.

Interior
The interior of the church is composed of a nave, covered by a ribbed vault, and two aisles covered by barrel vaults.

The walnut choir dates from 1523. Its origin is uncertain and probably originated from the collegiate church of San Pedro or from the abbey of La Merced.

The massive altarpiece is the work of Francisco de Agreda (1571), with influences of Juan de Juni. Its style shows a transition between the plateresque style and Mannerism.

Conservation
Much of the church was rebuilt in the 19th century, when it threatened to become a ruin.
The church was declared a national monument in 1929.

References

External links
 Tourism Office, Soria
 Iglesia de Nuestra Señora de la Mayor guiadesoria.es
 Pedro Luis Huerta, El arte romanico en la ciudad de Soria

Bien de Interés Cultural landmarks in the Province of Soria
Roman Catholic churches in Soria